Tokyo Xtreme Racer 2, known as  in Japan and Tokyo Highway Challenge 2 in Europe, is the sequel to Tokyo Xtreme Racer, which is also on the Sega Dreamcast. Tokyo Xtreme Racer 2 has been enhanced with better sound quality and graphics over its predecessor. The game managed to produce two more sequels. It is the last game in the series that was produced for Sega Dreamcast. Though some of the game's mechanics were implemented into Daytona USA 2001.

Reception

The game received "generally favorable reviews" according to the review aggregation website Metacritic. Jeff Lundrigan of NextGen said in his review of the game that the Tokyo Xtreme Racer series "has its adherents, and while we can clearly understand the attraction, for the most part we can't quite share it." In Japan, Famitsu gave it a score of 34 out of 40. GamePro said that the game "improves on the original, but not enough to make this an engaging racer. Kids, don't try this at home."

Sequels
In 2001 a port was created for the PlayStation 2 called Tokyo Xtreme Racer: Zero, but with improved graphics and slight differences in gameplay in order to complete the game.
In 2003 Tokyo Xtreme Racer 3 is the third game that was developed for PlayStation 2. The game takes place after the events of previous games. The response to this game was poor and was a limited release. The game was released in Japan and some parts of North America.

Notes

References

External links
 

2000 video games
Crave Entertainment games
Dreamcast games
Dreamcast-only games
Genki (company) games
Tokyo Xtreme Racer
Ubisoft games
Video game sequels
Video games developed in Japan
Video games set in Tokyo